Tristana may refer to:
 Tristana (novel), a novel published in 1892 by Benito Pérez Galdós
 Tristana (film), a 1970 Spanish film directed by Luis Buñuel based on the eponymous novel
 Tristana (song), a 1987 song recorded by the French artist Mylène Farmer
 Tristana, The Yordle Gunner, a playable champion character from the video game League of Legends

See also 
 Tristan (disambiguation)